The Scout and Guide movement in Saint Kitts and Nevis is served by two organisations
 The Girl Guides Association of Saint Christopher and Nevis, member of the World Association of Girl Guides and Girl Scouts
 The Scout Association of Saint Kitts and Nevis

See also